Fleetwith Pike is a fell in the English Lake District in the county of Cumbria which reaches a height of . The fell is a well-known feature of the area as it casts an imposing presence over Buttermere and the Honister Pass on the B5289 motor road between Borrowdale and Buttermere.

Topography
Fleetwith Pike is the north-western shoulder of Grey Knotts. It is bounded by Honister Pass to the north and Warnscale Bottom to the south-west, their two streams uniting beneath the fell in Buttermere. The north west ridge rising almost from the lakeshore at Gatesgarth is named Fleetwith Edge, and is a striking feature from any direction. The top of the fell is situated directly at the top of the edge, while a lower summit stands to the east atop Honister Crag. Fleetwith Pike is lined on all sides by impressive crags, other than for the broad plateau leading across the Drum House to Grey Knotts.

Slate extraction

The side of the fell which overlooks Honister Pass is actually known as Honister Crag and this has been commercially quarried for its high-quality green slate since the 1750s. Slate mining and quarrying at Honister did cease in 1986, but restarted in February 1997.

Ascents
The fell itself is often climbed in conjunction with other neighbouring fells such as Haystacks and Grey Knotts; strong walkers may also take in the peaks of Great Gable and Green Gable. There are two possible starting points for the ascent of Fleetwith Pike: these are Gatesgarth in the Buttermere valley and the top of the Honister pass. Both places have car parks. Honister Crag was upgraded to become a Nuttall fell in November 2004, the first addition to the list since they were first published in 1990, it has  of topographical prominence from Fleetwith Pike. After crossing Honister Crag it is a simple walk to attain the top of Fleetwith Pike. The ascent from Gatesgarth goes up the intimidating-looking Fleetwith Edge; however, all the crags can be by-passed without too much difficulty. This route goes past a white cross which is clearly visible from the valley and bears the inscription "Erected by Friends of Fanny Mercer, accidentally killed 1887".

Summit
The summit cairn is a few yards in from the top of the Edge, resting among pleasant grass and heather. The view from the summit gives a fine prospect of the Buttermere valley which also takes in the other two lakes of Crummock Water and Loweswater. The fells of Pillar and Great Gable are close by and are well seen.

See also

List of hills in the Lake District

References
 A Pictorial Guide to the Lakeland Fells, The Western Fells, Alfred Wainwright, 
 Complete Lakeland Fells, Bill Birkett, 
 The Mountains of England and Wales, John and Anne Nuttall, 
Info on Honister Crag becoming a Nuttall

Gallery

Hewitts of England
Fells of the Lake District
Nuttalls
Buttermere, Cumbria (village)